George Wesson Hawes (December 31, 1848 – June 22, 1882) was an American geologist.

Hawes was born December 31, 1848, in Marion, Ind., where his father, the Rev. Alfred Hawes, was pastor of the Presbyterian Church.  He lost his parents at an early age, and his youth was spent in Worcester, Mass, from which place he entered the Sheffield Scientific School of Yale University in 1865.  After two years he left the School, to enter into business in Boston but his natural taste for scientific pursuits brought him back to New Haven in 1871 to finish his course of study, graduating in 1872.

For the year after graduation he assisted Professor Johnson in his chemical laboratory, and for the next six years filled with marked success the position of assistant and instructor in mineralogy and blowpipe analysis in the Scientific School. He spent six months in the summer of 1878 in study in Breslau, and in March, 1879, again went abroad, for further study in Bonn and Heidelberg.  He received the degree of Ph.D at the University of Heidelberg in the summer of 1880, and then returned to his old place at New Haven.

In the following February he was made Director of the Geological Department of the National Museum in Washington, which position he held till his death. Overwork early in 1881, in connection with an investigation of the building-stones of the United States, for the Census Report, developed symptoms of consumption in the fall of the same year; and after a prolonged period of weakness, he died at Manitou Springs, Colorado, June 22, 1882, about a week after his arrival there, in the 34th year of his age. He was never married.

Dr. Hawes had given evidence of superior promise in the departments of mineralogy and lithology by his publications, the most important of which was a report in 1878 on the mineralogy and lithology of New Hampshire, published as part 4 of the Geology of that State.

1848 births
1882 deaths
People from Marion, Indiana
Yale University alumni
Sheffield Scientific School faculty
Heidelberg University alumni
American geologists
American male writers